James S. Pula (born 18 February 1946 in Utica, New York) is a Polish-American historian, professor, author, and Polonia activist.

He is a professor at Purdue University North Central, and specializes in ethnic and immigration studies and 19th-century American history.

He has served as president of the Polish American Historical Association and editor of Polish American Studies:  A Journal of Polish American History and Culture. He has a daughter, Marcia, and a son, Michael. With four grandchildren the oldest being Haley.

References
"Pula, James S.", Who's Who in Polish America, 1st edition, 1996-1997, New York, Bicentennial Publishing Corporation, 1996, p. 375.
"Pula, James S.", Directory [of] PIASA Members, 1999, New York City, Polish Institute of Arts and Sciences of America, 1999, p. 46.

Historians of Polish Americans
American people of Polish descent
1946 births
Purdue University faculty
Living people
The Polish Review editors